Drum Ode is an album by American jazz saxophonist Dave Liebman recorded in 1974 and released on the ECM label.

Reception
The Penguin Guide to Jazz selected this album as part of its suggested "Core Collection".

The Allmusic review awarded the album 3 stars.

Track listing
All compositions by Dave Liebman except as indicated

 "Goli Dance" (Traditional) - 0:34
 "Loft Dance" - 9:18
 "Oasis" (Liebman, Eleana Steinberg) - 5:29
 "The Call" - 4:47
 "Your Lady" (John Coltrane) - 6:37
 "The Iguana's Ritual" - 10:34
 "Satya Dhawani (True Sound)" - 6:22

Personnel
Dave Liebman - soprano saxophone, tenor saxophone, alto flute
Richard Beirach - electric piano
Gene Perla - bass, electric bass
John Abercrombie - electric guitar, acoustic guitar
Bob Moses, Jeff Williams - drums
Patato Valdez - congas
Barry Altschul, Steve Sattan - percussion
Badal Roy, Collin Walcott - tabla
Ray Armando - bongos, percussion
Eleana Sternberg - vocals

References

 

ECM Records albums
Dave Liebman albums
1975 albums
Albums produced by Manfred Eicher